Mitchell Chetkovich (July 21, 1917 – August 24, 1971) was a Major League Baseball pitcher. Chetkovich played for the Philadelphia Phillies in 1945. In 4 career games, he had a 0–0 record, with no runs, in 3 innings. He batted and threw right-handed.

Chetkovich was born in Fairpoint, Ohio and died in Grass Valley, California.

References

External links

1917 births
1971 deaths
Philadelphia Phillies players
Baseball players from Ohio